Gatuna may refer to the following:

Gatuna, Uganda, the Ugandan town on the border with Rwanda, also known as Katuna
Gatuna, Rwanda, the Rwandan town on the border with Uganda.